Donald Johnson and Francisco Montana were the defending champions, but lost in the semifinals this year.

Max Mirnyi and Andrei Olhovskiy won the title, defeating David Adams and Pavel Vízner 7–5, 7–6 in the final.

Seeds

Draw

Finals

External links
 Main Draw on ATP Archive

Open 13
1999 ATP Tour